Colegio Interamericano is a private international pre-school, primary and secondary school located in Zone 16 of Guatemala City, Guatemala. Founded in 1976, the bilingual school serves approximately 1,300 students and is accredited with the Southern Association of Colleges and Schools and AdvancEd, Cognia; and is a member of the Association of American Schools in Central America (AASCA). 

Students that graduate from Colegio Interamericano receive both the American High School Diploma and the Guatemalan Diploma.

History
Colegio Interamericano was founded in 1976 by the alumni of American School Guatemala, another international school in Guatemala City. In 1981, Colegio Interamericano relocated to its current location in Zone 16, and received its United States accreditation in 1989. The school is accredited by AdvancED and in 2013 received its five-year accreditation renewal. The school has an elementary school, middle school, and high school system of education.

See also 

 Education in Guatemala
 List of international schools

References

External links 
 Colegio Interamericano website

Elementary and primary schools in Guatemala
Schools in Guatemala City
Educational institutions established in 1976
1976 establishments in Guatemala
High schools and secondary schools in Guatemala
International schools in South America